Théophile Bovy (March 8, 1863 – June 6, 1937) was a Belgian journalist, poet and dramatic author in Wallonia, who wrote the words of the Le Chant des Wallons, the Walloon national anthem.

He was the father of actress Berthe Bovy.

Sources
 Cent Wallons

19th-century Belgian journalists
Male journalists
19th-century Belgian poets
19th-century Belgian dramatists and playwrights
19th-century Belgian male writers
20th-century Belgian poets
20th-century Belgian dramatists and playwrights
Belgian male dramatists and playwrights
National anthem writers
1863 births
1937 deaths
Walloon people
Belgian male poets
20th-century Belgian journalists